The Wembere River is a river located in north western Singida Region, Tanzania. The river is part of the water basin of Lake Eyasi.

The Wembere River originates in hilly country in central Tanzania at 6.0º south, and flows northwards through a branch of the Eastern Rift Valley. Its tributary the Nyahua River forms a seasonal floodplain 60 miles long and 1-5 km wide, covering 11,000 ha. After the Nyahua joins the Wembere from the northwest, the Wembere widens into a larger floodplain 105 km long and up to 20 km wide, and covering 140,000 ha. (4º12'-5º01' S/33º47'-34º11' E). Other tributaries are the Wamba, which joins from the northeast, the Mwaru, which joins from the east, and the Mapiringa, which joins from the west. The floodplain consists of flooded grasslands, inundated during the wet season and laced with drainage channels. Stands of the trees Vachellia seyal and Vachellia drepanolobium edge the seasonally-flooded portion of the plain. Above the floodplain, the eastern side of the watershed is chiefly miombo woodland, and the western side, called the Wembere Steppe, is Acacia-Commiphora savanna. 

Below the floodplain the river turns northeast and empties into the south end of Lake Kitangiri. Lake Kitangiri empties into Lake Eyasi via the Sibiti River.

References

Great Rift Valley
Rivers of Tanzania
Southern Eastern Rift
Zambezian flooded grasslands